A depocenter or depocentre in geology is the part of a sedimentary basin where a particular rock unit has its maximum thickness. Depending on the controls on subsidence and the sedimentary environment the location of basin depocenters may vary with time, such as in active rift basins as extensional faults grow, link or become abandoned.

References

Geology terminology